During the first and second civil conflicts which took place in the Democratic Republic of the Congo (DRC), all sides involved in the war actively recruited or conscripted child soldiers, known locally as Kadogos which is a Swahili term meaning "little ones". It has been estimated that the militia led by Thomas Lubanga Dyilo was 30 percent children. In 2011 it was estimated that 30,000 children were still operating with armed groups. The United Nations Organization Stabilization Mission in the Democratic Republic of the Congo (MONUSCO), released a report in 2013 which stated that between 1 January 2012 and 31 August 2013 up to 1,000 children had been recruited by armed groups, and described the recruitment of child soldiers as "endemic".

The former president Laurent Kabila had used children in the conflict from 1996 onwards and it was estimated that up to 10,000 children, some aged only seven years old, served under him.

The International Criminal Court (ICC), in the first trials held on human rights violations in the DRC, led to the first indictments, the first trials and the first convictions, in national jurisprudence for the use of children in combat.

Background 

It is estimated in the academic literature that up to 300,000 children form a part of both irregular, and regular armed forces worldwide, and that this number is increasing. In Africa it is estimated that up to 120,000 children, which is 40 percent of the worldwide total, are currently used as combatants or support personnel. Africa has the highest growth rate in the use of children in conflict, and on average, the age of those enlisted is also receding. In 2003 it was estimated that up to 30,000 children were used as soldiers in the DRC, with children making up up to forty percent of some militias.

In 1989 The United Nations passed the Convention on the Rights of the Child. Article 38 states that "State parties shall take all feasible measures to ensure that persons who have not attained the age of 15 years do not take a direct part in hostilities." The optional protocol on the involvement of children in armed conflict came into force in 2002 which stipulates that state actors "shall take all feasible measures to ensure that persons below the age of 18 do not take a direct part in hostilities and that they are not compulsorily recruited into their armed forces." The DRC is a signatory of both of these agreements. The official stance taken by UNICEF is that the use of children in armed conflicts is that it is morally reprehensible and illegal.

State reaction 

On 19 March 2006, Major Jean-Pierre Biyoyo was sentenced to five years in prison for recruiting and training child soldiers, it was the first time that a court in the DRC had tried, and convicted a soldier for child recruitment.

International reaction 

According to David M. Rosen, criticism has been levelled at the US over its support to nations which do recruit children into their armed forces. To comply with the Child Soldiers Protection Act (CSPA) in 2009 the State Department listed six nations that should be subject to sanctions under the act: Burma, Chad, the DRC, Somalia, Sudan and Yemen. On 25 October 2009, Barack Obama waived the restrictions on four of the six nations. As justification for this Obama stated that the nations involved were important in that they cooperated with interests essential to US foreign policy. The reason given for the DRC exemption was "a need to continue defense reform services and to influence the negative behaviour patterns of the military into a non-political professional force respectful of human rights." Obama also said that all four of these nations were making advances in the elimination of the use of children. However in the DRC child recruitment may actually be on the increase.

A report by MONUSCO confirmed that all parties to the conflict were recruiting girls as child soldiers, and that these children were frequently raped, or used as sex slaves or bush wives by groups such as the Union of Congolese Patriots (UPC) and Patriotic Forces for the Liberation of Congo (FPLC). In fact, according to a paper published by The International Peace Support Training Centre in Nairobi, Kenya, girls constitute a very large portion of child soldiers in the Democratic Republic of the Congo; roughly 40%. A study by Milfrid Tonheim in 2011, which surveyed many former female child soldiers in eastern Congo, also found that many of these girls return home to high levels of stigmatization, often related to the sexual abuse inflicted upon them.

Proceedings of the ICC 

Thomas Lubanga Dyilo, who was leader of the UPC, a group which operated in the Ituri region in the Northeast of the DRC, was indicted by the ICC in 2006 on three counts of war crimes, recruitment, conscription, and the use of children under 15 in combat. According to Michael Bochenek, who is the director of Amnesty International's International Law and Policy Program, the "verdict will give pause to those around the world who commit the horrific crime of using and abusing children both on and off the battlefield" Luis Moreno Ocampo has said that the Lubanga was "only the start of cases linked to the years of militia violence in Ituri which has killed thousands and produced more than 600,000 refugees."

Germain Katanga former leader of the Front for Patriotic Resistance of Ituri (FRPI), and Mathieu Ngudjolo Chui were indicted on seven counts of war crimes, and three counts of crimes against humanity in 2008, which included the use of children under 15 years of age being used in combat, by the pre trial chamber of the ICC. Katanga was convicted of having taken part in the Bogoro massacre on 24 February 2003. He was cleared of sexual offenses and the use of child soldiers.

References

Bibliography

 
  

 

Congo
Human rights abuses in the Democratic Republic of the Congo
Military of the Democratic Republic of the Congo